The 4th IBU Junior Open European Championships was held from 6 to 10 March 2019 in Sjusjøen, Norway.

There was a total of 8 competitions: Single Mixed Relay, Mixed Relay, Sprint Women, Sprint Men, Pursuit Women, Pursuit Men, Individual Women and Individual Men.

Schedule
All times are local (UTC+1).

Medal summary

Medal table

Men

Women

Mixed

References

External links
Official website
Results

IBU Junior Open European Championships
IBU Junior Open European Championships
IBU Junior Open European Championships
IBU Junior Open European Championships
International sports competitions hosted by Norway
Biathlon competitions in Norway
IBU Junior Open European Championships